Juliana Malacarne is a Brazilian IFBB professional bodybuilder. She is a four-time winner of the Olympia Women's Physique Showdown, having won every year from 2014 to 2017.

Early life
Malacarne was born in Americana, São Paulo. She is of Brazilian and Italian descent.

Career
Malacarne started training after inspiration from Monica Brant and participated in the 2005 IFBB Amateur BodyFitness Championships in São Paulo, where she earned her IFBB Pro Card. She moved to the United States in 2007 and competed at various fitness and physique competitions. She won the New York Pro Championship Women's Physique category in 2012, 2013, and 2014. She participated in the 2014 Olympia Women's Physique Showdown, defeating defending champion Dana Linn Bailey by a small margin, and went on to win the contest again in 2015, 2016, and 2017.

References

1974 births
Living people
Brazilian emigrants to the United States
Brazilian people of Italian descent
Fitness and figure competitors
Sportspeople from São Paulo